Heitō Glacier is a small glacier draining westward along the south side of Mount Heitō in the southern part of the Langhovde Hills, Queen Maud Land, Antarctica. It was mapped from surveys and air photos by the Japanese Antarctic Research Expedition (JARE), 1957–62, and was named Heitō-hyoga (flat-top glacier) for its proximity to Mount Heitō by JARE Headquarters in 1973.

See also
 List of glaciers in the Antarctic
 Glaciology

References

 

Glaciers of Queen Maud Land
Prince Harald Coast